Qaleh Now-ye Showkati (also Romanized as Qal‘eh Now-ye Showkatī and Qal‘eh-ye Now-e Showkatī; also known as Qal‘eh Nau, Qal‘eh Now, and Qal‘eh-ye Now) is a village in Shirvan Rural District, in the Central District of Borujerd County, Lorestan Province, Iran. At the 2006 census, its population was 350, in 87 families.

References 

Towns and villages in Borujerd County